Roodebergia is a monotypic genus of flowering plants belonging to the family Asteraceae. The only species is Roodebergia kitamurana.

Its native range is South African Republic.

References

Astereae
Monotypic Asteraceae genera